Pushkinska is a station on the Kharkiv Metro's Saltivska Line. Construction on the station began on 16 April 1977, and it opened on 10 August 1984, which made it the eighth station of the Saltivska Line. It is located in Kharkiv's city center, beneath the intersection of the "Petrovskoho" and "Pushkinska" streets, for which the station is named.  The Pushkinska station lies more than  underground which makes it the deepest station of the Kharkiv Metro system.

References

Kharkiv Metro stations
Railway stations opened in 1984